James or Jim Manley or Manly may refer to:
James Manley (American football) (born 1974), American football defensive tackle
James L. Manley (born 1949), professor of life sciences
James R. Manley (1782–1851), American physician and professor of obstetrics
James Manley (wrestler) (born 1958), American professional wrestler, better known by the ring name Jim Powers
James Manly (born 1932), Canadian politician
James Manly, sergeant in 3d Armored Cavalry Regiment during Mexican-American War
Jim Manley (artist) (born 1934), British artist
Jim Manley (songwriter) (born 1940), American songwriter and composer of hymns
Jim Manley (strategist), American political strategist